Mountain Volunteer Search and Rescue is a partially volunteer and non-profit mountain rescue organisation in Poland, helping people endangered while in the mountains; and preventing accidents as well as  protecting wildlife. GOPR is divided into seven divisions, one for every major mountain range in Poland. The headquarters of GOPR are situated in Zakopane. The Service acts legally, based on the parliament Act on safety and rescue in mountains and on organized ski areas. It employs 104 full-time workers, 1307 voluntary workers and 219 candidates. Each rescuer is obliged to pass the exam to be assigned for duties.

History 
The first attempts to create a mountain rescue service in the partitioned Poland took place in 1909. The team for Tatra Mountains was the only one in Poland till 1952, when the new rescue groups were created to cover all the mountain areas in Poland. The uniformed organisation was founded with the new structure and affiliated to the PTTK. In 1956, there were 5 separate groups parented by PTTK. In 2008, Polish GOPR conducted over 4,000 operations, helping 4,404 people.

Local groups 
GOPR operates in the total area of 20 410 km2 in all major mountain ranges in Poland. They maintain 7 200 km of hiking trails and 425 ski objects. The corps is divided into the following groups:
 Karkonosze Group
 Bieszczady Group
 Beskidy Group
 Jura Group
 Krynica Group, (Beskid Sądecki,Low Beskids)
 Podhale Group
 Group Wałbrzych - Kłodzko

See also 
 TOPR

Notes and references

External links 

 http://www.gopr.pl/ - an official website

Mountain rescue agencies
Emergency services in Poland
Charities based in Poland
1952 establishments in Poland